The 1999 Eddisbury by-election was a parliamentary by-election held on 22 July 1999 for the British House of Commons constituency of Eddisbury in Cheshire.

On 25 May 1999 the Foreign and Commonwealth Office announced the appointment of Eddisbury's Member of Parliament (MP), the Rt. Hon. Sir Alastair Goodlad, as High Commissioner to the Commonwealth of Australia. This created a vacancy in the seat which Sir Alastair had retained as the Conservative candidate in the 1997 general election. Sir Alastair resigned from the House of Commons by accepting the office of Steward and Bailiff of the Three Hundreds of Chiltern on 28 June 1999 to formally vacate his seat.

Candidates 
The Conservatives selected Stephen O'Brien, a former SDP member who lived in Chichester, to defend the seat. Labour nominated Margaret Hanson, wife of David Hanson (Labour MP for Delyn), who had also fought the seat at the 1997 election. Labour had been only just over 1,000 votes behind the Conservatives in 1997 and ran an energetic campaign, raising the issue of fox hunting which she pledged to ban. Prime Minister Tony Blair went to the constituency to campaign for her, an unusual move as it is convention for incumbent Prime Ministers not to visit byelection campaigns.

Polling day was 22 July and the result was a virtual carbon copy of that in 1997; each party had fought to a standstill.

Opinion polling

Results

See also
Eddisbury constituency
Lists of United Kingdom by-elections

References

External links
British Parliamentary By Elections:  Campaign literature from the by-election

By-elections to the Parliament of the United Kingdom in Cheshire constituencies
Eddisbury by-election
Eddisbury by-election
Eddisbury by-election
1990s in Cheshire